Paratelmatobius lutzii is a species of frog in the family Leptodactylidae. The species is endemic to Brazil, where it is known from the Mantiqueira Mountains in the state of Minas Gerais.
Its natural habitats are montane forests. It is only known from its type locality where it was once abundant, but it has not been seen there after 1978.

Etymology
The specific name, lutzii, is in honor of Brazilian physician and herpetologist Adolfo Lutz, who was the father of Bertha Lutz.

References

Further reading
Lutz B, Carvalho AL de. 1958. "Novos Anfíbios Anuros das Serras Costeiras do Brasil ". Memórias do Instituto Oswaldo Cruz, Rio de Janeiro 56 (1): 239–260. (Paratelmatobius lutzii, new species, pp. 241–243, 246–248). (in Portuguese and English).

lutzii
Endemic fauna of Brazil
Amphibians of Brazil
Taxa named by Bertha Lutz
Taxa named by Antenor Leitão de Carvalho
Amphibians described in 1958
Taxonomy articles created by Polbot